Milan "Mile" Marinković (born August 11, 1968) is a Bosnian professional basketball coach and former player.

Playing career 
Marinković played for the Crvena zvezda and BFC Beočin of the Yugoslav League. In 1992–93 season, he won the Yugoslav League with Crvena zvezda and played together with Dragoljub Vidačić, Nebojša Ilić, Saša Obradović, Mileta Lisica, Predrag Stojaković, Rastko Cvetković, Aleksandar Trifunović and Dejan Tomašević. During stint with BFC he played the 1995–96 FIBA Korać Cup season. Over two cup games, he averaged 7.5 points and 0.5 rebounds per game.

Marinković played for Bosnian teams such as Igokea and Sokolac. He played for Igokea at 2002–03 season of FIBA Europe Regional Challenge Cup – Conference South.

Career achievements and awards 
 Yugoslav League champion: 1 (with Crvena zvezda: 1992–93)

References

External links
 Player Profile at eurobasket.com

1968 births
Living people
Bosnia and Herzegovina basketball coaches
Bosnia and Herzegovina expatriate basketball people in Serbia
Bosnia and Herzegovina men's basketball players
KK BFC players
KK Crvena zvezda players
KK Igokea players
People from Prnjavor, Bosnia and Herzegovina
Serbs of Bosnia and Herzegovina
Small forwards
Yugoslav men's basketball players